People with the surname Grétry include:

André Grétry (1741–1813), composer of opéras comiques
Jeanne-Marie Grandon Grétry (1746–1807), painter, wife of André
Lucile Grétry (1772–1790), composer, daughter of André and Jeanne-Marie